Martine Smeets (born 5 May 1990) is a Dutch handballer who plays as a left wing for Liga Națională club CSM București and previously the Dutch national team.

International honours
EHF Cup:
Finalist: 2017
World Championship:
Gold Medalist: 2019
Silver Medalist: 2015
Bronze Medalist: 2017 
European Championship:
Bronze Medalist: 2018

References

External links

Dutch female handball players
1990 births
Living people
Sportspeople from Almelo
Expatriate handball players
Dutch expatriate sportspeople in France
Dutch expatriate sportspeople in Germany
Dutch expatriate sportspeople in Norway
Dutch expatriate sportspeople in Romania
Handball players at the 2016 Summer Olympics
Olympic handball players of the Netherlands
Handball players at the 2020 Summer Olympics
21st-century Dutch women